Éric Vigner (born October 27, 1960 in Rennes, France) is a French stage director, actor and scenic designer. He is directing the CDDB-Théâtre de Lorient, Centre Dramatique National from 1996 to 2015.

Biography 

Éric Vigner graduated from the University of Brittany, France, in the visual arts. He then studied in Paris, at the National School of theatre art and techniques (ENSATT) and at the National Drama Academy CNSAD. His consecutive qualifications naturally led towards directorship.

In 1990 he founded his own theater company SUZANNE M. Éric Vigner. In 1996 he was appointed by the Minister of Culture (France) to direct Brittany's Drama Centre, henceforth called the CDDB-Théâtre de Lorient. Since 1996 the graphic artists M/M Paris are in charge of the CDDB's visual communication.

In October 2010, Vigner founded his international theater Academy. The Academy follows the principles of a little democracy and assembles seven young trilingual actors from seven cultural backgrounds - Morocco, Romania, Mali, Belgium, South Korea, Germany, Israel. They work on classical as well as contemporary forms of writing and present La Place Royale by Corneille, Guantanamo by Frank Smith and La Faculté by Christophe Honoré.

He has chosen a course as a pioneer, an "’inter-lingual" navigator, building on dramatic art as common ground. He developed international collaborations to last over the years, searching for a genuine mutual cultural transmission. He directed in different languages and cultural backgrounds: at the National Theater of Korea in Seoul, The Bourgeois Gentleman by Molière and Jean-Baptiste Lully (French-Korean Cultural Prize 2004); twice at the National Theater of Albania, Tirana, 2007,The Barber of Seville by Beaumarchais (Price Festival Bharat Rang Mahotsav, Inde 2011), and 2016, Lucrezia Borgia by Victor Hugo (Festival Theatre National de Bretagne, France 2017); at 7 Stages Theater, Atlanta, 2008, In the Solitude of Cotton Fields by Bernard-Marie Koltès (U.S. Koltès Project); in India, Gates to India Song based on The Vice Consul and India Song by Marguerite Duras (Festival Bonjour India, Bombay, Calcutta, New-Delhi, 2013); at the Odeon Theatre in Bucharest, 2016, during Romania's campaign for Unesco's approval of The Wisdom of the Earth sculpture by Constantin Brâncuși, he staged the famous trial from 1928 - Brancusi versus the United States.

Actor 
1983: L'Instruction by Peter Weiss, directed by Robert Angebaud, Church in Saint-Étienne, Rennes
1984: La mort de Pompée by Pierre Corneille, directed by Brigitte Jaques, Lierre-Théâtre, Paris
1985: Fantasio by Alfred de Musset, directed by Vincent Garanger, CNSAD, Paris
1985: Romeo and Juliet by Shakespeare, directed by René Jauneau, Festival de Valréas
1986: Elvire Jouvet 40 directed by Brigitte Jaques, International Tour, film by Benoît Jacquot 1988
1988: Chouans ! Film by Philippe de Broca
1988: L'Épreuve by Marivaux, directed by Jean-Pierre Miquel, Festival d'Avignon
1989: Sophonisbe by Pierre Corneille, directed by Brigitte Jaques, Théâtre national de Chaillot, Paris
1989: Horace by Pierre Corneille, directed by Brigitte Jaques, Théâtre national de Chaillot, Paris
1990: Le Misanthrope by Molière, directed by Christian Colin, Centre Dramatique National de Gennevilliers, Paris
2018: Plaire, aimer et courir vite, film by Christophe Honoré

Theatre productions
"The theater which I am interested in develops a form for the spectator to project himself into, to reinvent himself. For me, theater is not a place to come to in order to get answers, but a place where it is possible to revisit stories, our ones, the intimate, forgotten ones - in fact an unfamiliar place into which the spectator can enter. Theater needs to carry in itself its counterpart, its paradox : "to be or not to be", to be one thing and at the same time something else. For example, when Cézanne paints apples and says "It is with an apple that I want to amaze Paris", his subject is not the apple. His subject is painting. The same goes for theater. It is not the story we are actually attached to, but the theater itself."
Éric Vigner 
1988: La Place royale by Pierre Corneille, CNSAD, Paris
1991: La Maison d'os by Roland Dubillard, Festival d'Automne, Grande Arche de la Défense, Paris
1992: Le Régiment de Sambre et Meuse based on the works of Alphonse Allais, Louis-Ferdinand Céline, Jean Genet, Roland Dubillard, Georges Courteline, Franz Marc, Quartz Brest
1993: La Pluie d'été by Marguerite Duras, Masterclass CNSAD, Quartz Brest, National and International Tour
1993: Le soir de l'Obériou - Elizavieta Bam by Daniil Charms, Theater Laboratory Anatoli Vasiliev, Moscow
1994: Le Jeune Homme by Jean Audureau, Théâtre de la Commune Aubervilliers
1994: Reviens à toi (encore) (Looking at you (Revived) Again) by Grégory Motton, Odéon Theatre, Paris
1995: Bajazet by Jean Racine, Created at the Comédie-Française, Paris
1996: L'Illusion comique by Pierre Corneille, CDDB - Théâtre de Lorient, National Tour
1996: Brancusi contre États-Unis, un procès historique, 1928, adapted for the stage by Éric Vigner, 50th Festival d'Avignon, Centre Georges Pompidou, Tribunal de Pau
1998: Toi cour, moi jardin by Jacques Rebotier, CDDB - Théâtre de Lorient
1998: Marion Delorme (Hugo) by Victor Hugo, Théâtre de la Ville, Paris, National Tour
1998: La Douleur (The War) by Marguerite Duras, CDDB - Théâtre de Lorient
1999: L'École des femmes (The School for Wives) by Molière, Comédie-Française, Paris
2000: Rhinocéros by Eugène Ionesco, CDDB - Théâtre de Lorient
2001: La Bête dans la jungle The Beast in the Jungle, adapted by Marguerite Duras, CDDB - Théâtre de Lorient, Espace Go, Montreal, John F. Kennedy Center for the Performing Arts
2002: Savannah Bay by Marguerite Duras, Comédie-Française, Paris, Nationale Tour
2003: ...Où boivent les vaches by Roland Dubillard, CDDB - Théâtre de Lorient, Théâtre du Rond-Point, Paris, Nationale Tour
2004: Le Jeu du kwi-jok ou Le Bourgeois gentilhomme (The Bourgeois Gentleman) by Molière and Jean-Baptiste Lully, National Theater of Korea in Seoul, Opéra-Comique, Paris
2006: Pluie d'été à Hiroshima, based on the works of Marguerite Duras La Pluie d'été and Hiroshima mon amour, 60th Festival d'Avignon, Cloître des Carmes, National Tour.
2007: Jusqu'à ce que la mort nous sépareby Rémi De Vos, Théâtre du Rond-Point, Paris
2007: Le Barbier de Séville (The Barber of Seville) by Pierre Augustin Caron de Beaumarchais, National Theater of Albania Tirana
2007: Savannah Bay by Marguerite Duras, created at Théâtre Espace Go, Montreal
2007: Débrayage by Rémi De Vos, CDDB - Théâtre de Lorient
2008: In the Solitude of Cotton Fields by Bernard-Marie Koltès, 7 Stages Theater in  Atlanta
2008: Othello by William Shakespeare, CDDB - Théâtre de Lorient, Odéon Theatre, Paris
2009: Sextett by Rémi De Vos, CDDB - Théâtre de Lorient, Théâtre du Rond-Point, Paris, Espace Go, Montreal
2010: Le Barbier de Séville (The Barber of Seville) by Pierre Augustin Caron de Beaumarchais
2011: La Place Royale by Pierre Corneille, CDDB - Théâtre de Lorient
2011: Guantanamo by Frank Smith, Centre Dramatique National Orléans/Loiret/Centre
2012: La Faculté by Christophe Honoré, Festival d'Avignon
2013: Gates to India Song, based on the works of Marguerite Duras India Song and Le Vice-Consul, Festival Bonjour India, Delhi (Residence de France (ambassade)); Kolkata (Tagore House, Rabindra Bharati University); Mumbai (Prithvi Theatre et NCPA)
2014: Tristan by Éric Vigner
2015: L'Illusion comique de Corneille, CDDB-Théâtre de Lorient
2016: Brâncuși impotriva Americii, Odeon Theater, Bukarest, Romania
2017: Lukrecia Borxhia, by Victor Hugo, Albanian National Theater, Tirana
2018 : Partage de midi by Paul Claudel, Théâtre National de Strasbourg
2019 : Partage de midi by Paul Claudel, Théâtre de la Ville, Paris, Festival Croisements, Chine

Opera productions
2000: La Didone, opera by Francesco Cavalli, musical director Christophe Rousset, Montpellier Opera
2003: L'Empio punito, opera by Alessandro Melani, musical director Christophe Rousset, Leipzig Opera
2004: Antigona, opera by Tommaso Traetta, Montpellier Opera, Chatelet Theatre, Paris
2013: Orlando, opera by George Frideric Handel, musical director Jean-Christophe Spinosi, Théâtre de Lorient.

Scenic designs
1983: L'instruction by Peter Weiss, directed by Robert Angebaud
1984: La Casa Nova by Carlo Goldoni, directed by Robert Angebaud
1984: Peinture-sur-Bois by Ingmar Bergman, directed by François Kergoulay
1985: Pusuda Le Guetteur by Cahit Atay, directed by François Kergourlay
1986: La Place royale by Pierre Corneille
1990: La Maison d'os by Roland Dubillard
1992: Le Régiment de Sambre et Meuse based on the works of Alphonse Allais, Louis-Ferdinand Céline, Jean Genet, Roland Dubillard, Georges Courteline, Franz Marc
1993: La Pluie d'été by Marguerite Duras
1993: Le soir de l'Obériou - Elizavieta Bam by Daniil Charms
1994: Le Jeune Homme by Jean Audureau
1994: Reviens à toi (encore) by Grégory Motton
1996: L'Illusion comique by Pierre Corneille
2000: Rhinocéros by Eugène Ionesco
2000: La Didone, opera composed by Francesco Cavalli, musical director Christophe Rousset
2001: La Bête dans la jungle adapted by Marguerite Duras, based on the play by James Lord and the novel by Henry James
2002: Savannah Bay by Marguerite Duras
2003: ...Où boivent les vaches by Roland Dubillard
2003: L'Empio punito, opera by Alessandro Melani, musical director Christophe Rousset
2004: Le Jeu du kwi-jok ou Le Bourgeois gentilhomme by Molière, music by Jean-Baptiste Lully
2007: Jusqu'à ce que la mort nous sépare by Rémi De Vos
2007: Le Barbier de Séville (The Barber of Seville) by Pierre Augustin Caron de Beaumarchais
2007: Savannah Bay by Marguerite Duras
2007: Débrayage by Rémi De Vos
2008: In the Solitude of Cotton Fields by Bernard-Marie Koltès
2008: Othello by William Shakespeare
2009: Sextett by Rémi De Vos
2010: Le Barbier de Séville (The Barber of Seville) by Pierre Augustin Caron de Beaumarchais
2011: La Place Royale by Pierre Corneille
2011: Guantanamo by Frank Smith
2012: La Faculté by Christophe Honoré
2013: Gates to India Song, based on the works of Marguerite Duras India Song and Le Vice-Consul, Festival Bonjour India, Delhi (Residence de France (ambassade)); Kolkata (Tagore House, Rabindra Bharati University); Mumbai (Prithvi Theatre et NCPA)
2013: Orlando, opera composed by George Frideric Handel, musical director Jean-Christophe Spinosi, Théâtre de Lorient
2014: "Tristan" by Éric Vigner
2017: Lukrecia Borxhia, by Victor Hugo, Albanian National Theater, Tirana
2018 : Partage de midi by Paul Claudel, Théâtre National de Strasbourg

The Academy 
2011 : La Place Royale by Pierre Corneille, CDDB-Théâtre de Lorient
2011 : Guantanamo by Frank Smith, Centre Dramatique National d'Orléans
2012 : La Faculté by Christophe Honoré, Cours du Lycée Mistral, Festival d'Avignon

Decorations 
 Officer of the Order of Arts and Letters (2015)

References

External links
 Introduction works Éric Vigner
 Éric Vigner's archives

Living people
Scenic design
Breton artists
French scenic designers
French theatre directors
French opera directors
1960 births
French National Academy of Dramatic Arts alumni
Officiers of the Ordre des Arts et des Lettres